Solar hot water in New Zealand is increasingly used on both new and existing buildings.

Solar thermal technologies had a sizable initial uptake in the pioneering days of the 1970s. By 2001 more than 40GWhr was produced from solar hot water technologies, equating to 0.1% of the total electricity consumption in New Zealand.
In 2006 the government announced an investment of $15.5 million over the first three and a half years of a five-year Solar Water Heating program to increase the number of solar hot water heating installations. As of 2006 there were about 35,000 solar hot water installations on domestic and commercial buildings.

There are now eleven manufacturers and importers in the industry with most of the collector system being locally made.

Barriers to adoption
The main barrier for the installation of solar hot water systems is the initial capital investment. Other barriers are the conservatism of the building industry, lack of influence on increasing the sale price of houses, conflicting interest between housing investors and home-owners, lack of adequate information about solar hot water heating, and lack of governmental support due to fears of loss of GST revenue and competition with its own state owned hydro power generation enterprises.

See also
 Renewable energy in New Zealand
 Solar power in New Zealand

References

External links
Solar energy at the Energy Efficiency and Conservation Authority
Solar hot water promotion at EECA energywise
New Zealand Solar Industries Association
Solar Hot Water System

Solar thermal energy
Renewable energy in New Zealand